Amor Amor may refer to:

Film and TV
, 2018 Portuguese film with Ana Moreira and Margarida Vila-Nova
Amor Amor (TV series), 2021 Portuguese telenovela

Music

Albums
Amor Amor, album by Lolita Flores 1975
Amor Amor, album by Conjunto Primavera Latin Grammy award Best Norteño Album
Amor Amor (José José album) 1980
Amor Amor, album by Arielle Dombasle 2004
Amor Amor, album by Fernando Echavarría and La Familia André
Amor Amor, album by

Songs
"Amor Amor" (Gabriel Ruiz song), also known as "Amor, Amor, Amor"
"Amor Amor", hit song by Lolita Flores 1975
"Amor Amor" (José José song), single, written Rafael Pérez Botija 1980
"Amor Amor", song by Luis Alberto del Parana And His Trio Los Paraguayos	1962
"Amor Amor" (Roselyn Sánchez song), single nominated for a Latin Grammy from Borinqueña (album)
"Amor Amor (Amour c'est toute dire)", song by Dalida from Femme est la nuit, also from À ma manière... Coup de chapeau au passé
"Amor Amor", song from Walkin' My Baby Back Home (Jo Stafford album)
"Amor Amor", hit song from W (Wanessa album)

See also
 Amor (disambiguation)